Dasyphyllum lehmannii is a species of flowering plant in the family Asteraceae. It is found only in Ecuador. Its natural habitat is subtropical or tropical moist montane forests. It is threatened by habitat loss.

References

lehmannii
Flora of Ecuador
Critically endangered plants
Taxonomy articles created by Polbot
Taxa named by Ángel Lulio Cabrera
Taxobox binomials not recognized by IUCN